32nd Bengal Native Infantry could refer to the:

3rd Brahmans in 1824
34th Sikh Pioneers in 1861